The 1970 Tennessee Volunteers football team (variously "Tennessee", "UT" or the "Vols") represented the University of Tennessee in the 1970 NCAA University Division football season. Playing as a member of the Southeastern Conference (SEC), the team was led by head coach Bill Battle, in his first year, and played their home games at Neyland Stadium in Knoxville, Tennessee. They finished the season with a record of eleven wins and one loss (11–1 overall, 4–1 in the SEC) and a victory over Air Force in the Sugar Bowl. The 1970 Tennessee defense holds the record for most takeaways in a single season with 57, not including the bowl game in which they recorded 8 more.

Schedule

Roster

Team players drafted into the NFL

References

Tennessee
Tennessee Volunteers football seasons
Sugar Bowl champion seasons
Tennessee Volunteers football